Barquín or Barkin (modern Basque spelling) is a Basque surname widely present in the province of Biscay and Cantabria.

People
 Pedro Zaballa Barquín, a Spanish footballer
 Francisco Bilbao Barquín, a Chilean writer
 Celia Barquín Arozamena, a Spanish golfer

See also 
 Basque surnames

Surnames
Basque-language surnames